is a song by the Japanese rock band Shinsei Kamattechan. The television edit version of the song was released on December 7, 2020, while the full version was released on February 22, 2021 by Pony Canyon.

Background and release 
"My War" is Shinsei Kamattechan's fifteenth single and sixth as a limited release, following "Mainichi ga News" (2019). It was used as the opening theme for the fourth season of the Attack on Titan anime series. It is the second song used in the anime after "Yūgure no Tori" (2017). Like "Yūgure no Tori", the cover of "My War" was drawn by Attack on Titan creator, Hajime Isayama. It features a girl, probably Gabi Braun, an Attack on Titan character, holding a rifle, dressed in school clothes and standing in the middle of a classroom. In an interview with the Natalie website, Isayama said, "as a loyal fan of Shinsei Kamattechan, I am very happy to see the opening song composed by them."

In an interview with Natalie, band member Noko said, "'My War' is a song that blends all of Shinsei Kamattechan's styles, including intense, deep and subtle, rocking and beautiful. And due to the large budget given in advance by the producer, he was able to incorporate the coveted symphony into the song." Noko later said that Isayama had many things in common with the band, so just like "Yūgure no Tori", it was easy to achieve this collaboration, and it was also related to the dark style of the latest season of Attack on Titan. The singer revealed that the confinement due to the COVID-19 pandemic in Japan also affected the genre of "My War". He indicated that he was in a state of mental and emotional instability in 2020, but noted that it was beneficial and was reflected in the outcome of his work. Regarding some words in the song, Noko denied in a live broadcast that there were Spanish words as speculated by the foreign audience. He also stated that he did not say the word "monster" at the end either.

The release date of "My War" was not announced in advance, but it was released unannounced on December 7, 2020 JST, the day the first episode of the anime aired. Subsequently, Shinsei Kamattechan performed the song for the first time publicly at Net Generation 20 held at Liquidroom in Shibuya, Tokyo on December 27.

Track listing

Personnel 

Shinsei Kamattechan
 Noko – vocals, guitar, production
 Mono – keyboard
 Misako – drums

 Others appearances
 Yukako Shiba – 1st violin
 Yusa – 2nd violin
 Masashi Yamamoto – contrabass
 Akane Suda – clarinet
 Hinako Miyahara – flute, piccolo
 Motomitsu Zakouji – trumpet
 Shinya – trombone
 Sasara Matsuzaki – soprano chorus
 Midori Shimura – alto chorus
 Kazushige Shimura – tenor chorus
 Takehiko Sasaki – bass chorus

 Production
 Shinya Mochida – tech
 Makio Hagiya – recording engineer
 Ryo Kanai – recording engineer
 Keiji Kondo – mix engineer

Charts

Weekly charts

Award

References 

2021 singles
2021 songs
Anime songs
Attack on Titan
Crunchyroll Anime Awards winners
Japanese rock songs
Pony Canyon singles